Patrick Christopher "Christy" O'Connor (21 December 1924 – 14 May 2016) was an Irish professional golfer. He was one of the leading golfers on the British and Irish circuit from the mid-1950s.

O'Connor won over 20 important British and Irish tournaments and finished in the top 10 in the Open Championship on 10 occasions. Later he had considerable success in seniors events, twice winning the World Senior Championship. In team events he played in 10 successive Ryder Cup matches and played in 15 Canada Cup/World Cup matches for Ireland, winning the Canada Cup in 1958 in partnership with Harry Bradshaw.

Early life
Born in Knocknacarra, Galway in 1924, O'Connor caught his first glimpse of golf at the nearby Galway Golf Club, and from the age of 10 spent most of his spare time there. His foray into professional golf began with caddying, first at Galway and then over at Tuam Golf Club. He turned professional in 1951, with Tuam members funding his first tournament at the Open Championship at Royal Portrush, Antrim that same year. His 19th-place finish garnered a membership invitation from Bundoran Golf Club in Donegal, which he accepted.

Golf career
O'Connor first professional win was at the Swallow-Penfold Tournament held in 1955, the first £1,000 prize to be offered in British golf. He went on to win the 1956 and 1959 British Masters. In 1958, he helped Ireland to win the Canada Cup in Mexico City playing with Harry Bradshaw. A year later, he moved to Dublin and joined The Royal Dublin Golf Club. Throughout the 1960s he won at least one professional event during each year on the British Tour, a level of consistent success matched by very few other players. O'Connor rarely played professional tournaments outside Britain or Ireland, at one stage saying he forwent playing at the US Masters in Augusta because he couldn't afford to participate.

The only major championship O'Connor played was the Open Championship. He played the event 26 times between 1951 and 1979. His best performance came at the 1965 Open Championship where O'Connor tied for second place with Brian Huggett, two behind five-time winner Peter Thomson. He easily outplayed international stars like Jack Nicklaus, Arnold Palmer, Sam Snead, and Gary Player. He received an astonishing 20 invitations to play the Masters but rejected all of them, citing prohibitive financial costs.

O'Connor played in every Ryder Cup from 1955 to 1973, setting a record of ten appearances in the event which stood until it was surpassed by Nick Faldo in 1997. He was Irish professional champion on ten occasions, including in 1978 (when he was 53), and was twice (1961 and 1962) recipient of the Vardon Trophy for leading the British Tour's Order of Merit.

In the 1966 Carroll's International at Royal Dublin, O'Connor finished 2-3-3 (eagle-birdie-eagle) to win the tournament by 2 strokes. At the par-4 16th he drove the green and holed a 20-foot putt. He then holed a 12-foot putt at the 17th and, at the par-5 18th, hit a 3-iron to 8 feet and holed the putt. A plaque by the 16th tee commemorates the achievement. In 1970, he won the John Player Classic, at that time its £25,000 first prize was the richest offered in golf (in those days, even the British Open champion received just a little over £5,000), it made him that season's leading money-winner, although not Order of Merit leader, which was decided by a points system not directly related to prize money.

Later in his career, O'Connor became the leading "senior" (over-50s) professional player of his day, just before the lucrative U.S.-based Senior PGA Tour, now known as the PGA Tour Champions, took off. He won the PGA Seniors Championship six times and the World Senior Championship in 1976 and 1977. O'Connor was elected to the World Golf Hall of Fame in 2009 in the Veterans category.

Personal life
O'Connor met his wife, Mary Collins, in Donegal while he was a member of Bundoran Golf Club. They married in 1954 and had six children together. During his early career he was known simply as Christy O'Connor, but his nephew of the same name also became a prominent golfer, and since that time they have been referred to as Christy O'Connor Senior and Christy O'Connor Junior, respectively. He was known as "Himself" among his golfing peers. He died at the age of 91 in Mater Hospital, on 14 May 2016.

Honours
O'Connor Sr (and his nephew, O'Connor Jr) were awarded a joint honorary doctorate by NUI Galway in 2006.

Professional wins (64)

European Tour wins (1)

European circuit wins (22)

Other wins (33)
1953 Ulster Professional Championship, Irish Dunlop Tournament
1954 Ulster Professional Championship
1955 Irish Dunlop Tournament
1957 Hennessy Tournament
1958 Irish PGA Championship, Canada Cup (with Harry Bradshaw)
1960 Irish PGA Championship, Hennessy Tournament, Irish Dunlop Tournament (shared with Jimmy Kinsella), Moran Cup
1961 Irish PGA Championship, Hennessy Tournament
1962 Irish PGA Championship, Hennessy Tournament, Irish Dunlop Tournament, Gleneagles Hotel Foursomes Tournament (with Noel Fogarty)
1963 Irish PGA Championship, Hennessy Tournament
1965 Irish PGA Championship, Irish Dunlop Tournament
1966 Irish PGA Championship, Irish Dunlop Tournament, Carrolls No. 1 Tournament
1967 Irish Dunlop Tournament
1968 Carrolls No. 1 Tournament
1969 Southern Irish Championship
1970 Sean Connery Pro-Am
1971 Irish PGA Championship, Links Pro-Am
1975 Irish PGA Championship
1976 Southern Irish Championship
1978 Irish PGA Championship
1980 Links Pro-Am (tie)

Senior wins (8)
1976 PGA Seniors Championship, World Senior Championship
1977 PGA Seniors Championship, World Senior Championship
1979 PGA Seniors Championship
1981 PGA Seniors Championship
1982 PGA Seniors Championship
1983 PGA Seniors Championship

Source:

Playoff record
European Senior Tour playoff record (0–1)

Results in major championships

Note: O'Connor only played in The Open Championship.

CUT = missed the half-way cut (3rd round cut in 1977 Open Championship)
"T" indicates a tie for a place

Team appearances
Ryder Cup (representing Great Britain & Ireland): 1955, 1957 (winners), 1959, 1961, 1963, 1965, 1967, 1969, 1971, 1973
World Cup (representing Ireland): 1956, 1957, 1958 (winners), 1959, 1960, 1961, 1962, 1963, 1964, 1966, 1967, 1968, 1969, 1971, 1975
Joy Cup (representing the British Isles): 1955 (winners), 1956 (winners), 1958 (winners)
Slazenger Trophy (representing Great Britain and Ireland): 1956 (winners)
Amateurs–Professionals Match (representing the Professionals): 1956 (winners), 1958, 1959 (winner)
R.T.V. International Trophy (representing Ireland): 1967 (captain)
Double Diamond International (representing Ireland): 1971 (captain), 1972 (captain), 1973 (captain), 1974 (captain), 1975 (captain), 1976 (captain), 1977 (captain)
PGA Cup: (representing Great Britain and Ireland) 1975 (non-playing captain)

See also
List of people on stamps of Ireland

Notes

References

External links

Irish male golfers
European Tour golfers
European Senior Tour golfers
Ryder Cup competitors for Europe
World Golf Hall of Fame inductees
Sportspeople from County Galway
People from Clontarf, Dublin
1924 births
2016 deaths